Ates Gürpınar (born 25 September 1984) is a German politician of The Left who is serving as member of the Bundestag since 2021 and one of six deputy leaders of his party since 2018. He is also co-chairman of the Bavarian branch of The Left since 2016.

Life and career
Gürpinar was born to a Turkish father and a German mother. He attended the Edith-Stein-Schule in Darmstadt and earned his Abitur in 2003. He studied at the University of Erlangen–Nuremberg from 2004 to 2011 and graduated with a magister degree in media science and a master's in ethics of text cultures. He also studied modern German literary history and philosophy but did not earn a degree. He teaches media studies and economics at the Darmstadt University of Applied Sciences.

Political career
Gürpinar joined The Left in 2010. He became politically engaged due to the Afghanistan and Iraq wars, as well as the Europe-wide student protests in which he participated in 2009. He became press spokesman for the Bavarian party branch in 2012, and was state managing director from 2014 to 2016. In 2016, he was elected co-leader of the state party. In the 2017 German federal election, he stood in Munich North constituency and won 6.0% of the vote. He was not elected. Along with his counterpart Eva Bulling-Schröter, he was lead candidate for The Left in the 2018 Bavarian state election, but the party failed to win any seats.

In February 2021, Gürpiner was elected one of six federal deputy leaders of The Left. At a party congress, he was nominated with 52% of votes and confirmed with 77%.

In the 2021 German federal election, Gürpinar was elected to the Bundestag in fourth place on the state list. He also ran in the Rosenheim constituency, winning 2.2% of votes.

References

External links

Living people
1984 births
German politicians of Turkish descent
Politicians from Munich
Members of the Bundestag for Bavaria
Members of the Bundestag for The Left
Members of the Bundestag 2021–2025
University of Erlangen-Nuremberg alumni